Guy Badash (born 24 May 1994) is an Israeli professional footballer who plays as a midfielder for Israeli Premier League club Hapoel Jerusalem and the Israel national team.

Early life
Badash was born and raised in Kfar Saba, Israel, to an Israeli family of Jewish descent.

International career
Badash made his senior International debut for the Israel national football team on 27 September 2022 in a friendly match against Malta.

See also
List of Jewish footballers
List of Jews in sports
List of Israelis

References

External links
 
 
 
 
 

1994 births
Living people
Israeli Jews
Israeli footballers
Jewish footballers
Footballers from Kfar Saba
Hapoel Kfar Saba F.C. players
Hapoel Nir Ramat HaSharon F.C. players
Hapoel Tel Aviv F.C. players
Beitar Tel Aviv Bat Yam F.C. players
Sektzia Ness Ziona F.C. players
Hapoel Jerusalem F.C. players
Israeli Premier League players
Liga Leumit players
Israeli people of Tunisian-Jewish descent
Israel international footballers
Association football forwards